Tyche  is a hypothetical gas giant located in the Solar System's Oort cloud, first proposed in 1999 by astrophysicists John Matese, Patrick Whitman and Daniel Whitmire of the University of Louisiana at Lafayette.  They argued that evidence of Tyche's existence could be seen in a supposed bias in the points of origin for long-period comets. More recently, Matese and Whitmire re-evaluated the comet data and noted that Tyche, if it existed, would be detectable in the archive of data that was collected by NASA's Wide-field Infrared Survey Explorer (WISE) telescope. In 2014, NASA announced that the WISE survey had ruled out any object with Tyche's characteristics, indicating that Tyche as hypothesized by Matese, Whitman, and Whitmire does not exist.

History
Matese, Whitmire and their colleague Patrick Whitman first proposed the existence of this planet in 1999, based on observations of the orbits of long-period comets. Most astronomers agree that long-period comets (those with orbits of thousands to millions of years) have a roughly isotropic distribution; that is, they arrive at random from every point in the sky. Because comets are volatile and dissipate over time, astronomers suspect that they must be held in a spherical cloud tens of thousands of AU distant (known as the Oort cloud) for most of their existence. However, Matese and Whitmire claimed that rather than arriving from random points across the sky as is commonly thought, comet orbits were in fact clustered in a band inclined to the orbital plane of the planets. Such clustering could be explained if they were disturbed by an unseen object at least as large as Jupiter, possibly a brown dwarf, located in the outer part of the Oort cloud. They also suggested that such an object might explain the trans-Neptunian object Sedna's peculiar orbit. However, the sample size of Oort comets was small and the results were inconclusive.

Orbit
This is well within the Oort cloud, whose boundary is estimated to be beyond 50,000 AU. It would have an orbital period of roughly 1.8 million years. A failed search of older IRAS data suggests that an object of  would need to have a distance greater than 10,000 AU. Such a planet would orbit in a plane different from the ecliptic, and would probably have been in a wide-binary orbit at the time of its formation. Wide binaries may form through capture during the dissolution of a star's birth cluster.

Mass

It would be insufficiently massive to undergo nuclear fusion reactions in its interior, a process that occurs in objects above roughly 13 Jupiter masses. Although more massive than Jupiter, Tyche would be about Jupiter's size since degenerate pressure causes massive gas giants to increase only in density, not in size, relative to their mass. If Tyche was to be found, it was expected to be found by the end of 2013 and only be 1–2 Jupiter masses.

Origin of name
Tyche (meaning "fortune" or "luck" in Greek) was the  Greek goddess of fortune and prosperity. The name was chosen to avoid confusion with an earlier similar hypothesis that the Sun has a dim companion named Nemesis, whose gravity triggers influxes of comets into the inner Solar System, leading to mass-extinctions on Earth. Tyche was the name of the "good sister" of Nemesis.  This name was first used for an outer Oort cloud object by J. Davy Kirkpatrick at the Infrared Processing and Analysis Center of the California Institute of Technology.

WISE mission
The Wide-field Infrared Survey Explorer (WISE) space telescope has completed an all-sky infrared survey that includes areas where Whitmire and Matese anticipate that Tyche may be found. On March 14, 2012, the first-pass all-sky survey catalog of the WISE mission was released. The co-added (AllWISE) post-cryo second survey of the sky was released at the end of 2013. On March 7, 2014, NASA reported that the WISE telescope had ruled out the possibility of a Saturn-sized object at 10,000 AU, and a Jupiter-sized or larger object out to 26,000 AU (0.4 light-years).

See also
 Kelvin–Helmholtz heating
 Nemesis (hypothetical star)
 Planet Nine
 Planets beyond Neptune 
 Vulcan (hypothetical planet)

Notes

References

Hypothetical bodies of the Solar System
Solar System dynamic theories
Hypothetical planets
Hypothetical trans-Neptunian objects
Oort cloud
Astronomical controversies